is a Japanese actress who is affiliated with Horipro. She originally debuted in magazines of gravure and variety shows, then later working as an actress. She is well known for portraying Miki in Cutie Honey: The Live.

Biography
Misaki won the 29th Horipro Tarento Scout Caravan in the Weekly Young Sunday award (best gravure award) and debuted. Her advertising slogan is "Heisei-born F Cup". On January 15, 2005, Misaki debuted in the gravure magazine, Weekly Young Sunday. On October 12, 2005, she served as the first police chief in the Harajuku police station. In 2006, Misaki was elected in Five Star Girl. On March 2, 2006, she became in the entertainer women's futsal team Xandu loves NHC. In December 2006, in Ninki ko gekidan to Gravure Idol no Collaboration of Otaiba Show-Geki-jō, Misaki debuted in Nirubauna directed by Seiji Nozoe. In October 2007, she appeared in Cutie Honey: The Live as Miki Saotome. In 2012, Misaki appeared in Tokumei Sentai Go-Busters as Escape starting from episode 22.

Filmography

TV series

Films

References

External links
 Official agency profile 
 
 

1989 births
Living people
Actors from Hyōgo Prefecture
Japanese gravure idols
Japanese television personalities
21st-century Japanese actresses